The Monastery of Saint Matthew the Potter, also known as the Monastery of Saint Matthew the Poor, is a Coptic Orthodox monastery in Upper Egypt. It was founded by a Coptic monk of the same name. It is located in Luxor Governorate near the town of Naq 'al-Zinaiqa, about seven kilometers northwest of the village of Asfun al-Matana near Esna. The monastery is built at the edge of the desert. It was uninhabited for a period of time, but in 1975, Coptic Orthodox monks reestablished a presence there. Excavations done by French archeologists between the Monastery of Saint Matthew the Poor and the Monastery of the Martyrs have revealed much about the history of Coptic monasticism in this region.

See also
Saint Matthew the Potter
Coptic Orthodox Church
Coptic monasticism

References
2000 Years of Coptic Christianity. By Meinardus, Otto F. A. 1999. American University in Cairo Press. .
Christian Egypt: Coptic Art and Monuments Through Two Millennia. By Capuani, Massimo. 1999. Liturgical Press. .
Churches and Monasteries of Egypt and Some Neighboring Countries. By Abu Salih the Armenian. Edited and Translated by Evetts, B.T.A. 2001. Gorgias Press. .

Matthew The Potter
Matthew The Potter
Christian monasteries established in the 8th century
Buildings and structures in Luxor Governorate